4-Acetyloxy-N,N-diallyltryptamine (or 4-AcO-DALT) is a tryptamine derivative. It has been sold as a designer drug, but little other information is available. It was first officially identified in seized drug samples in 2012.

See also
 DALT
 5-MeO-DALT

References

Tryptamines
Designer drugs
Acetate esters
Allylamines